Andrzej Chowaniec (born January 1, 1958) is a former Polish ice hockey player. He played for the Poland men's national ice hockey team at the 1984 Winter Olympics in Sarajevo.

References

1958 births
Living people
Ice hockey players at the 1984 Winter Olympics
Olympic ice hockey players of Poland
People from Sucha County
Podhale Nowy Targ players
Sportspeople from Lesser Poland Voivodeship
Polish ice hockey defencemen